Mare nostro (Our Sea) is a comic opera in two acts composed by Lorenzo Ferrero to an Italian-language libretto by Marco Ravasini, loosely based on Vittorio Alfieri's 1804 comedy L'antidoto (o Tre veleni rimesta, avrai l'antidoto). The work was completed in 1985 and first performed at the Teatro Comunale, Alessandria on 11 September 1985.

The story, set on a small Mediterranean island, concerns "a Middle European philosopher, alert to the implications of a postmodern world, who deserts negative dialectics for money-making."

Performance history 
The original production directed by Giorgio Barberio Corsetti and conducted by Edoardo Müller was subsequently performed at the Benevento Città Spettacolo festival in Benevento on 14 September and at Settembre Musica in Turin on 19 September 1985. A new production of the opera conducted by Gianfranco Masini was performed on 18 October 1991 at the Teatro Sociale, Rovigo and on 26 October at the Teatro Comunale, Treviso. This production has been recorded on a double audio CD by the Italian record label Ricordi.

Roles

Synopsis
Place: A small Mediterranean island
Time: Unspecified

Act 1

Vinerblut, a temporarily unemployed Middle-European philosopher specialising in "cultural criticism," arrives on an unnamed Mediterranean island, having heard about a miraculous fishing machine. By listening to a conversation among the natives he finds out that the ingenious invention has become the property of Pigliatutto, the owner of the island. He introduces himself with some presents to Pigliatutto, who mistakes him for someone else he is expecting. Vinerblut pretends to be an itinerant clairvoyant luminary and predicts a terrible fate for the island and its inhabitants, promising at the same time to deliver an antidote. 

Act 2

Pigliatutto's servants want to run away and Candeggina dreams of escaping with Vinerblut. Astradiva, Rimestino and Marchingello decide to seize the machine at all costs but Vinerblut manages to steal it first, after which he prepares to leave the island with Candeggina. On the beach at dawn, the trunk in which the stolen machine is hidden bursts open and everybody starts fighting over it until the apparatus falls to pieces. Pigliatutto appears and announces that Mr. Ivenmor, the foreign investor he was expecting, has arrived with plans to turn the island into a tourist village. He would like to punish the quartet of natives and the false prophet for their treachery and theft but Ivenmor suggests that they should become tourist animators in the new resort.

Notable arias and excerpts
The orchestral Intermezzo ("Intermezzo notturno") was arranged for small orchestra as an excerpt for concert performance and premiered in Milan in December 1986.

Recordings

References
Notes

Sources
 Bagnoli, Giorgio, ed. (1993). The La Scala Encyclopedia of the Opera. New York: Simon & Schuster. 
 Dorsi, Fabrizio and Giuseppe Rausa (2000). Storia dell'opera italiana. Paravia Bruno Mondadori Editori.  
 Fearn, Raymond (1998). Italian Opera since 1945. London: Routledge. 
 Gelli, Piero, ed. (2007). Dizionario dell'Opera 2008 entry: "Lorenzo Ferrero". Milano: Baldini Castoldi Dalai editore. 
 Holden, Amanda, ed. (2001). The New Penguin Opera Guide. London: Penguin Books. 
 Iesuè, Alberto (1988). Storia della musica. Padova: Franco Muzzio & C editore spa. 
 Sadie, Stanley, ed. (1992–2002). The New Grove Dictionary of Opera. London: Macmillan Publishers. 
 Webb, Michael D. (2008). Italian 20th Century Music: The Quest for Modernity. London: Kahn & Averill. .

External links
 Casa Ricordi Catalogue
 Manuscript page in Casa Ricordi Digital Collection 

Operas
Operas by Lorenzo Ferrero
1985 operas
Italian-language operas
Operas based on plays
Operas set in fictional, mythological and folkloric settings